Cléber is a masculine given name, common in Brazil.

People with the name, several known as "Cléber", include:
Cléber Guedes de Lima (born 1974), Brazilian footballer 
Cléber (footballer, born March 1982), Cléber Ferreira Manttuy, Brazilian football defender
Cléber (footballer, born August 1982), Cléber Luis Alberti, Brazilian football goalkeeper
Cléber (footballer, born 1990), Cléber Janderson Pereira Reis (born 1990), Brazilian footballer
Cléber Nascimento da Silva (born 1986), Brazilian footballer
Cléber Nelson de Andrade Raphaelli, also known as Cléber Gaúcho (born 1974), Brazilian footballer
Cléber Resende de Oliveira (born 1979), Brazilian footballer
Cléber Américo da Conceição (born 1969), Brazilian footballer
Cléber Monteiro (born 1980), Brazilian footballer
Cléber Santana (born 1981), Brazilian footballer
Cléber Schwenck Tiene (born 1979), Brazilian footballer

See also
 Kléber (disambiguation)

Portuguese masculine given names